Metadherin, also known as protein LYRIC or astrocyte elevated gene-1 protein (AEG-1) is a protein that in humans is encoded by the MTDH gene.

Function 

MTDH (AEG-1) is involved in HIF-1alpha mediated angiogenesis. MTDH also interacts with SND1 and involved in RNA-induced silencing complex (RISC) and plays very important role in RISC and miRNA functions. MTDH has been shown to interact with spliceosome proteins in the cell nucleus and regulate the process of alternative splicing. 

MTDH induces an oncogene called Late SV40 factor (LSF/TFCP2) which is involved in thymidylate synthase (TS) induction and DNA biosynthesis synthesis. Late SV40 factor (LSF/TFCP2) enhances angiogenesis by transcriptionally up-regulating matrix metalloproteinase-9 (MMP9).

Clinical significance 

MTDH acts as an oncogene in melanoma, malignant glioma, breast cancer and hepatocellular carcinoma. It is highly expressed in these cancers and helps in their progression and development. It is induced by c-Myc oncogene and plays an important role in anchorage independent growth of cancer cells (metastasis).

Elevated expression of MTDH, which is overexpressed in more than 40% of breast cancers, is associated with poor clinical outcomes. MTDH has a dual role in promoting metastatic seeding and enhancing chemoresistance. MTDH is therefore a potential therapeutic target for enhancing chemotherapy and reducing metastasis. 

MTDH has been shown to be overexpressed in prostate cancer, where there is a shift towards a more cytoplasmic localisation, signalling a poor prognosis. In the nucleus of prostate cancer cells, MTDH has been shown to affect alternative splicing of genes such as CD44, which may also be associated with prostate cancer progression.

LSF/TFCP2 plays a multifaceted role in chemo resistance, EMT, allergic response, inflammation and Alzheimer’s disease.

MTDH controls many hallmarks of oncogenes and cancer. MTDH/AEG-1 induces hepato steatosis in mouse liver. MTDH knockdown by artificial microRNA interference functions as a potential tumor suppressor in breast cancer. Astrocyte elevated gene-1/MTDH undergoes palmitoylation in normal and abnormal cell physiology. Biomaterial titanium substrata with microgrooves can alter MTDH expression in human primary cells.

Interactions 

MTDH has been shown to interact with:

 Nucleolin, 

 NF-kB-p65 subunit,

References

Further reading 

 
 
 
 
 
 
 
 

Breast cancer